The Bail Project is a 501 (c)(3) non profit organization aiming to pay bail for people who are not financially capable of doing so themselves. The Bail Project also provides pretrial services. The Bail Project was founded in 2017 by Robin Steinberg. In January 2018, the organization launched its first site as a national operation. As of 2020, it has 22 locations across the United States and has helped pay bail for over 12,000 people.

History 
The Bail Project was founded in 2017 by Robin Steinberg, who is also the founder of The Bronx Defenders. In her time as a public defender, Steinberg found that when a judge would set bail and her client did not have the money, they would often plead guilty even if they were innocent. This motivated Steinberg to push The Bail Project forward as a way of challenging the cash bail system.

Bail is typically paid only in cash. It is used as a way to guarantee the defendant will make an appearance at each hearing, or the money will be forfeited to the government. There are criticisms of bail in the United States that question the ethics of the system. Because of this, the Bail Project is working toward eliminating the use of cash bail.

Defendants are referred to The Bail Project by a public defender, and from there, they are interviewed to determine if they should receive support from the organization.

Work 

According to their 2019 annual report, The Bail Project has posted $14.8 million in bail with the help of donations, and has helped 6,965 people since 2018. The Bail Project also provides pretrial support, including making sure that clients are aware of their court dates.

The Bail Project employs individuals who have been incarcerated in the past and work to help others during their difficult times. Sheldon McElroy, the national deputy director of operations for The Bail Project, went to jail at 18 years old, with a bail set at $500. Tracy Stanton, another employee for The Bail Project, had also been incarcerated. In a six-month span, she had been in and out of jail three times.  She now works as a client advocate for the Bail Project with their St. Louis team.

Notable cases 
In 2018, The Bail Project posted bail for a 33-year-old man in Los Angeles after he had been accused of robbery with bail set at $30,000. His case was dismissed with no evidence of the robbery. In San Diego, the Bail Project paid bail for over 700 immigrants in 2018. As of November 2019, The Bail Project has posted bail for 121 clients in the Cuyahoga County Jail in Cleveland. In Kentucky, the Bail Project paid the $1,500 bond for Demontez Campbell after he missed a court date and was issued a bench warrant.

After the COVID-19 outbreak, The Bail Project set up a number of releases from Cook County Jail in Chicago. As of April 4, 2020, 60 inmates were projected to be released and between 500 and 1,000 were expected to be released within the following weeks. In Louisville Kentucky, The Bail Project assisted with the release of Black Lives Matter protesters by posting bail. In Indianapolis, The Bail Project posted the bail of 20 protestors as of June 2020, and has supported 400 people. The Bail Project has a tent located in downtown Indianapolis and has provided support for over 500 people in the city.

Criticism and consequences 
In April 2019, The Bail Project's St. Louis branch bailed out Samuel Scott, who was charged with domestic violence; following his return home, Scott beat his wife to death. "Domestic violence … will not be resolved by keeping people in jail, after a judge has already deemed them eligible for release, just because they can't afford cash bail," stated Robin Steinberg, founder of the Bail Project.

Christopher Stewart, who was caught illegally with a handgun and threatened to kill his ex-girlfriend, was bailed out with $5,000 in cash in early 2020. A month after his bail, he attempted to kill his ex-girlfriend by setting her apartment on fire. In an interview, Stewart's ex-girlfriend expressed that: "They need to do better if they are going to have a charity bail people out. That's wasting money that could have gone to someone who would have done right by it."

Travis Lang, who was previously being held in jail for possession of cocaine in addition to three other felony charges, including breaking and entering, resisting arrest and burglary was bailed out by The Bail Project in January 2021.  Lang resumed selling drugs and on October 1, 2021, shot and killed Dylan McGinnis

Another criminal whose bond was paid by the Bail Project is Marcus Garvin. Garvin was charged with battery, after stabbing a customer in the parking lot of a convenience store where he was working as a clerk.  Following his release, he was soon charged with stabbing his girlfriend 51 times and dismembering her body 

Rawshawn Gaston-Anderson, a serial criminal who was arrested for burglary and theft, was released from jail after The Bail Project paid his $3,000 bail. Less than a week after Gaston-Anderson was released from the Las Vegas jail, he shot a waiter, Chengyan Wang, eleven times. Wang survived the attack and is currently suing The Bail Project for a claimed lack of due diligence. The Bail Project has since closed its Las Vegas chapter due to restructuring.

See also 
 The Bronx Defenders
 The Bronx Freedom Fund

References

External links 

 Board at The Bail Project

Bail in the United States
Charities based in California
501(c)(3) organizations